The Arena Football League Offensive Player of the Year Award is given annually by the Arena Football League (AFL) to the offensive player of the AFL believed to have had the most outstanding season. Multiple-award winners include Eddie Brown, Aaron Garcia, Chris Jackson and Damian Harrell whom won the award two times each. As of the 2015 season, the most recent winner is Dan Raudabaugh of the Philadelphia Soul.

References

External links
AFL Offensive Player of the Year

Arena Football League trophies and awards